Lepidium ruderale is species of flowering plants in the mustard or cabbage family, Brassicaceae. It is native to temperate Asia and northern and eastern Europe.  It has also naturalized in southwestern Europe and North America. Its common names include narrow-leaf pepperwort, roadside pepperweed, and peppergrass.

References

External links

ruderale
Flora of Central Asia
Flora of Eastern Europe
Flora of Western Asia
Plants described in 1753
Taxa named by Carl Linnaeus